Christian Mark Short (born 9 May 1970) is a former footballer who played as a defender for Scarborough, Notts County, Huddersfield Town, Sheffield United and Stoke City. He also played non-league football for Pickering Town and Hinckley United.

Playing career
Born in Münster, West Germany, Short grew up in Yorkshire and followed his older brother Craig from non-league Pickering Town on to Scarborough. He was loaned to Manchester United before joining his brother again at Notts County for £240,000, Scarborough's record sale. He helped Neil Warnock's side reach the top flight in his first season and he stayed there until 1995, when he joined Sheffield United. Brian Little took him to Stoke City on a free transfer in 1998 and impressed as an attacking right back.

However, just a month into his Stoke career he collapsed on the edge of the pitch at Fulham on 8 September 1998 and had to be revived with oxygen. Short went on a number of checks at the hospital but they found no problems with him. He was put on a sodium diet and says that he always felt "tired and out of breath". Eventually he was diagnosed with a circulation disorder and retired from playing after ending his career with Scarborough and Hinckley United.

Coaching career
Short later worked as a strength and conditioning coach and sports massage therapist and has also worked as a fitness coach with Blackburn Rovers, Crystal Palace, Derby County, Leicester City and Sheffield United. Short joined Neil Warnock's coaching set-up at Leeds United as the first team fitness conditioner on 13 July 2012. Short left the club shortly after the sacking of Neil Warnock, with manager Brian McDermott bringing in his own fitness coach Jon Goodman.

In November 2016 he became the fitness coach at Bradford City. He left his role with Bradford in June 2018.

A month after leaving Bradford he moved to Blackpool as the new First Team Coach.

He joined Oxford United in 2018, as the club's new Head of Sports Science.  Short left this role at the end of the 2020/21 season to join Middlesbrough, but departed following Neil Warnock’s sacking the following November.

He returned to Oxford United for a second spell in the club's sports science department in September 2022 on a short-term basis, initially until Christmas, helping out with the first team and women's side.

Personal life
His brother Craig was also a professional footballer. He and his brother now regularly row across the English channel for charity. Both have played for Pickering Town, Scarborough, Notts County and Sheffield United. The two have also worked together at Oxford United.

Career statistics

References

External links
 
 

1970 births
Living people
Sportspeople from Münster
Footballers from North Yorkshire
English footballers
Association football defenders
Scarborough F.C. players
Notts County F.C. players
Huddersfield Town A.F.C. players
Sheffield United F.C. players
Stoke City F.C. players
Hinckley United F.C. players
English Football League players
Pickering Town F.C. players
Blackburn Rovers F.C. non-playing staff
Crystal Palace F.C. non-playing staff
Derby County F.C. non-playing staff
Sheffield United F.C. non-playing staff
Leeds United F.C. non-playing staff
Bolton Wanderers F.C. non-playing staff
Footballers from Yorkshire
Bradford City A.F.C. non-playing staff
Footballers from North Rhine-Westphalia
Blackpool F.C. non-playing staff
National League (English football) players
Association football coaches